El Flaco is a 2010 documentary short film directed by Krisstian de Lara. The short premiered on May 1, 2010 at the Sun City Film Festival in El Paso, Texas and won Best Documentary and Best in Festival awards.

Plot 
A 27-year-old male prostitute tells his story of what is like to work in the streets of downtown Ciudad Juárez, Mexico, pay for police protection, and work in a hostile atmosphere.

Production 
The Director, Krisstian de Lara, asked his mother to lend him money to compensate the male prostitute for appearing in the documentary.

References

External links 
 Official website
 

2010 films
2010 short documentary films